The Smith–Hammond–Middleton Memorial Center is a 3,200-seat multi-purpose arena in Orangeburg, South Carolina, named in memory of Samuel Hammond, Delano Middleton, and Henry Smith, who died in the Orangeburg Massacre, the same night the arena opened. It is home to the South Carolina State University Bulldogs basketball teams.

See also
 List of NCAA Division I basketball arenas

References

External links
South Carolina State University Athletics - SHM Memorial Center

College basketball venues in the United States
Basketball venues in South Carolina
Indoor arenas in South Carolina
South Carolina State Bulldogs and Lady Bulldogs basketball
Sports venues in Orangeburg County, South Carolina
Buildings and structures in Orangeburg County, South Carolina